Football Division 3 is the fourth level of Thai football organized by Football Association of Thailand. It was started in 2016 by an idea from General Police Somyot Poompanmoung, the president of FAT for improving all Thai Amateur clubs to be better and allowing other clubs which are in other regions chances to play in a national FA tournament. In 2016, the tournament is divided into 5 regions and participated by 104 clubs which are former members  Khǒr, Khor, and Ngor Royal Cup, and debutants in the season. As the tournament is considered as the lowest level of Thai football, so the number of participants is unlimited as well as any club is able to send an application to participate in the tournament. In 2015 the Ngor Royal Cup became a trophy for the Football Division 3.

Football Division 3 played its final season in 2016 and the Thailand Amateur League began to play in 2017. All Football Division 3 clubs, became the original Thailand Amateur League members.

Champions History

Champions of the 4th tier Thai football league system

Thai Football Division 3 Seasons

2016

See also 
 Football records in Thailand

References

 
Football leagues in Thailand
Sports leagues established in 2016
Sports leagues disestablished in 2017
2016 establishments in Thailand
2017 disestablishments in Thailand